Into the Forest is a 2015 Canadian apocalyptic independent drama film, written and directed by Patricia Rozema, based on the 1996 Jean Hegland book and starring Elliot Page and Evan Rachel Wood as orphaned survivalist sisters in a forest without electrical power.

Plot
In the near future, two teenage sisters, Nell and Eva, live in a remotely located home with their father in a forest. There is a massive, continent-wide power outage that appears to be part of a region-wide technological collapse. The car battery is drained, so they are left stranded for days. Their father eventually gets the car working and they make it to the nearest town, where they buy supplies including gas from a man named Stan. Eva later attends dance class while her sister meets up with her boyfriend, Eli. Returning home, they see a stranded car and the girls' father offers to help the passengers, but the family move on after they brandish guns. The father says that they will not return to town until the power is restored. Later, while cutting down a tree, he cuts his leg badly with a chainsaw. Knowing he is bleeding to death, he tells the girls to take care of each other and love one another. They bury him where he died in the forest.

Two months pass and the girls are low on food. They are also getting by with the skills that their father taught them, though they miss some of the creature comforts they used to have. For instance, Eva has to dance to a metronome since she can no longer listen to music.

Eli arrives one night, having walked there looking for Nell. He says that all the surrounding houses are abandoned. After Nell and Eli sleep together, he says there may still be power and order in Boston. He convinces Nell to go with him, but as they leave, Nell turns back after a night away from home, unwilling to leave Eva. Nell researches plants for food and medicine, and forages. After a night of celebration when Nell confirms she is not pregnant, while Nell is foraging in the forest, Eva is surprised by Stan while she is chopping wood. He assaults and rapes her before stealing most of the remaining gas and the car. The girls board the house up and Eva stays within doors. Eva throws up, and soon realizes she is pregnant. To Nell's surprise, Eva has decided to keep the baby, saying that she does not want to lose any more. To help nourish Eva during her pregnancy, Nell hunts and butchers a pig.

During a storm, several beams of the roof break and Eva goes into labor. The sisters flee for a hollowed out tree stump that once served as their play house, where Eva gives birth to a baby boy. Returning to their ruined home, Eva decides to burn the house down with the remainder of the gas that their father purchased from Stan in case anyone passing will think that they died in a fire. Before setting the house ablaze, they collect a few precious items and keepsakes such as a family photo, and begin to walk into the darkened forest.

Cast
 Elliot Page as Nell
 Evan Rachel Wood as Eva
 Max Minghella as Eli
 Callum Keith Rennie as Robert, Dad
 Wendy Crewson as Mom
 Michael Eklund as Stan
 Sandy Sidhu as Quiz Woman
 Jordana Largy as Margot
 Bethany Brown as Gabs
 Simon Longmore as Biker
 Brittany Willacy as Gigi

Production
Director Megan Griffiths was considered to direct, but was ultimately passed on by the producers. On October 21, 2013, Elliot Page and Evan Rachel Wood joined the cast. Principal photography and production began on July 28, 2014. On August 27, 2014, Max Minghella and Callum Keith Rennie joined the cast. Elliot Page learned how to butcher a pig in order to perform the process well in the movie. Evan Rachel Wood's methodical approach to getting into Eva's character included eating extremely small portions of food. During the assault scene, the pressure from her screaming caused the blood vessels in her eyes to burst .

Release
The film premiered in the Special Presentation section at the 2015 Toronto International Film Festival on September 12, 2015. Shortly after, A24 and DirecTV Cinema acquired U.S. distribution rights to the film, it premiered on DirecTV before showing theaters. In December 2015, the film was announced as part of TIFF's annual Canada's Top Ten screening series of the ten best Canadian films of the year. It was released theatrically in 15 theaters in Canada on June 3, 2016 and in the United States on July 29. The film played for one week in 15 theaters where it grossed nearly $10,000.

Reception
Into the Forest received generally positive reviews from critics. On Rotten Tomatoes, the film has a rating of 78%, based on 46 reviews, with an average rating of 6.8/10. The site's critical consensus reads, "Into the Forest grounds its familiar apocalyptic framework with a relatable look at the bond between two sisters, compellingly brought to life by [Elliot] Page and Evan Rachel Wood." On Metacritic, the film holds a score of 59 out of 100, based on 18 reviews, indicating "mixed or average reviews".

References

External links

Into the Forest at Library and Archives Canada

2015 films
2015 drama films
2010s pregnancy films
2015 science fiction films
A24 (company) films
Bron Studios films
Apocalyptic films
Canadian drama films
2010s English-language films
English-language Canadian films
Films about sisters
Films scored by Max Richter
Films directed by Patricia Rozema
Films set in forests
Films set in the future
Films shot in British Columbia
Canadian survival films
Films produced by Elliot Page
2010s Canadian films